Plescioara may refer to the following places in Romania:

 Plescioara, a tributary of the river Jaleș in Gorj County
 Plescioara, a tributary of the river Bâsca Chiojdului in Buzău County
 Plescioara, a village in the commune Chiojdu, Buzău County